According to a 2009 report by the Pew Research Center, there are 1,000 Muslims in the Northern Mariana Islands who constitute approximately 0.7% of the population.

References

Northern Mariana Islands
Religion in the Northern Mariana Islands
Northern Mariana Islands
Northern Mariana
+Northern Mariana